Guðmundur "Gunni" Torfason (born 13 December 1961, in Vestmannaeyjar) is an Icelandic  former footballer and manager.

Playing career

Club
A striker, he became top goalscorer in the Icelandic league in 1986 with 19 goals when he was also named the Player of the Year. He moved to continental Europe with Belgian sides Beveren and Winterslag who later merged with Waterschei to become Racing Genk. Guðmundur became the first ever goalscorer of the new club when he scored against KV Mechelen. He then had a spell with Austrians Rapid Vienna, before joining St Mirren in 1989. He became club top scorer three seasons in a row. In 1992 Guðmundur left St Mirren for St Johnstone. In 1995, he moved for a brief spell at Doncaster Rovers. He returned to Iceland to play for second division Fylkir and eventually ended his career after spending the 1996 season with Grindavík.

International
Guðmundur made his debut for Iceland in July 1985 friendly match against the Faroe Islands and has earned a total of 26 caps, scoring 4 goals. He represented his country in 5 FIFA World Cup qualification matches and played his last international match for Iceland in a November 1991 European Championship qualifying match against France.

International goals
Scores and results list Iceland's goal tally first.

Managerial career
Guðmundur was a player-coach for Fylkir during the 1995 season. In November 1995, he was hired as the coach of Grindavík. He coached Fram in 2000.

On 30 October 2011 Guðmundur returned to Scottish football after being appointed as Rangers' Icelandic scout.

References

External links 
 
 Player archive - Rapid Wien
 

1961 births
Living people
Gudmundur Torfason
Gudmundur Torfason
Gudmundur Torfason
Gudmundur Torfason
Gudmundur Torfason
Gudmundur Torfason
K.S.K. Beveren players
K.F.C. Winterslag players
K.R.C. Genk players
SK Rapid Wien players
St Mirren F.C. players
St Johnstone F.C. players
Doncaster Rovers F.C. players
Gudmundur Torfason
Gudmundur Torfason
Austrian Football Bundesliga players
Expatriate footballers in Austria
Gudmundur Torfason
Expatriate footballers in Scotland
Gudmundur Torfason
Expatriate footballers in Belgium
Icelandic expatriate sportspeople in Belgium
Expatriate footballers in England
Icelandic expatriate sportspeople in England
Scottish Football League players
Association football forwards